Navagio Beach (Greek: Παραλία Ναυάγιο), or Shipwreck Beach, is an exposed cove, sometimes referred to as "Smugglers Cove", on the coast of Zakynthos, in the Ionian Islands of Greece.  Navagio Beach was originally known as Agios Georgios.

In popular culture
The location was prominently featured in the hit Korean drama Descendants of the Sun, leading to a surge of interest among Chinese and Korean tourists.

History and namesake
On 2 October 1980, the coaster MV Panagiotis, ran aground in the waters around Zakynthos Island on Navagio Beach during stormy weather and bad visibility. Some rumours claim the ship was smuggling contraband; however, official sources did not confirm this, and the captain was not convicted for such offences at the time. Recently released court documents and photos relating to the incident back up the smuggler story, suggesting that Panagiotis was allegedly making its way from Turkey with a freight of contraband cigarettes headed for Italy. Encountering stormy weather, the ship ran aground in the cove, where the crew abandoned her to evade the pursuing Navy. After the captain alerted the authorities, 29 locals were convicted of looting the cargo and valuable equipment from the wrecked ship. The ship was abandoned and still rests buried in the limestone gravel of the beach that now bears the nickname Shipwreck. 

The beach was briefly closed in 2018, and swimming and boat anchoring were forbidden, after a cliff above the beach collapsed. The beach reopened and anchoring is permitted, but with restrictions out of concerns over future landslides.

In 2018, the beach was named as the world's best beach in a poll by over 1,000 travel journalists and professionals.

Gallery

References

Beaches of Greece
Landforms of Zakynthos
Tourist attractions in the Ionian Islands (region)
Landforms of the Ionian Islands (region)